Wild C.A.T.S is a half-hour animated television series based on the comics series of the same name and developed for television by David Wise. It aired on CBS for one season from October 1, 1994, to January 21, 1995. The series was produced by WildStorm Productions in association with Nelvana.

Overview
When the evil Daemonites emerge from the shadows, multi-billionaire Jacob Marlowe assembles the Wild C.A.T.s, a team of warriors who are descendants of the heroic Kherubim race.

Production

Wild C.A.T.S, along with Teenage Mutant Ninja Turtles and Skeleton Warriors, was grouped into the "Action Zone" showcase that used a wraparound animated fly-though pre-credit sequence to bookend the three very different programs. The series was canceled around the same time that the "Action Zone" concept was officially retired (although TMNT retained the "Action Zone" credit sequence until the end of its run two years later). Following its cancellation, Wild C.A.T.s was picked up by USA Network and was aired as part of the USA Action Extreme Team block from 1995 to 1996.

The Wild C.A.T.s were composed of the original roster from the comic series. The major villain was Helspont, and the Troika and the Coda were featured as supporting characters. Mr. Majestic also made appearances, though not as a member of the group.

The series featured a rock soundtrack, with the theme song performed by Sheree Jeacocke and Gerry Mosby.

Cast
 Rod Wilson as Hadrian-7/Spartan and Majestyk
 Roscoe Handford as Lady Zannah/Zealot
 Colin O'Meara as Cole Cash/Grifter
 Ruth Marshall as Priscilla Kitaen/Voodoo
 Dean McDermott as Reno Bryce/Warblade
 Paul Mota as Jeremy Stone/Maul
 Sean McCann as Jacob Marlowe
 Janet-Laine Green as Void
 Maurice Dean Wint as Helspont
 Colin Fox as Pike
 Dave Nichols as Attica
 Addison Bell as Slag
 Dan Hennessey as H.A.R.M.
 Denis Akiyama as Dockwell
 Kristina Nicholl as Artemis
 Lorne Kennedy as Karillion
 Jim Millington as Zachary Forbes
 Bob Zidel as Professor Stone
 David Hemblen as Commander

Episodes

Marketing tie-ins
CBS published a one-shot comic book to promote the Action Zone time slot, featuring characters from Wild C.A.T.s, Teenage Mutant Ninja Turtles, and Skeleton Warriors. The cover art was illustrated by Jim Lee.

Playmates Toys released a Wild C.A.T.s toy line of six-inch action figures from 1994 to 1995. The characters featured in the toy line were Spartan, Grifter, Zealot (Kherubim Warrior and Coda Uniform versions), Warblade, Maul (standard and Flexon Combat Suit versions), Voodoo, Void, Helspont, Pike, and a generic Daemonite. Mr. Majestic, Max Cash (as Black Razor), Slag, and a color variant of Pike were released as part of the comics-oriented "Image Universe" sub-line. The Bullet Bike was the sole vehicle in the toy line. In addition, Playmates released giant 10-inch figures of Spartan, Grifter, and Maul.

A video game based on the TV series was published by Playmates Interactive in 1995 for the Super NES, with Spartan, Warblade, and Maul as the only playable characters.

Reception
TechnicallyIDoComics of The Top Tens ranked Wild C.A.T.s at No. 5 on his list of the Top Ten Worst Comic Book Animated TV Shows, commenting that "Choppy animation, sloppy voice-directing, and -- most importantly -- the most careless writing of any superhero cartoon I've ever witnessed as far as plot progression, character development, and dialogue are all concerned. Add an embarrassingly obnoxious theme song (lyrics and all), and you've got a recipe for disaster."

Home media
Wild C.A.T.s was released on VHS by Sony Wonder from 1994 to 1996. Funimation released the complete series on DVD on July 19, 2005. The series is also available on Amazon Prime Video and Tubi.

In 2019, the entire series was uploaded on Retro Rerun's YouTube channel.

References

External links

 

1990s American animated television series
1990s American science fiction television series
1994 American television series debuts
1995 American television series endings
1990s Canadian animated television series
1990s Canadian science fiction television series
1994 Canadian television series debuts
1995 Canadian television series endings
American children's animated action television series
American children's animated adventure television series
American children's animated science fantasy television series
American children's animated superhero television series
Canadian children's animated action television series
Canadian children's animated adventure television series
Canadian children's animated science fantasy television series
Canadian children's animated superhero television series
Animated television shows based on DC Comics
English-language television shows
CBS original programming
Funimation
Playmates Toys
Television series by Nelvana
Television series based on Image Comics
USA Action Extreme Team
WildStorm